Lake Thompson is a former lake in California. The name is derived from an academic who first speculated on the possibility that a lake existed in lower Antelope Valley. It occupied the area of the lower Antelope Valley and of the lakes Rogers Lake and Rosamond Lake during the Pleistocene. It dried up during the Holocene.

Context 

During the Pleistocene, a number of lakes formed in the deserts of North America, these include Lake Bonneville in Utah, Lake Lahontan in Nevada, a cascade of lakes after Owens Lake, Lake Mojave and Lake Manly in California. Their formation was directed by cold periods of the last glacial maximum and other climate oscillations such as the Younger Dryas that reduced evaporation in the deserts, as well as storm tracks that were displaced south by the continental ice sheets.

The lake 

Two islands existed in the water body, cliffs have been cut at some sites along its former shore and there are dunes as well. 

Stickleback fish may have entered the lake through Peninsular Ranges drainages and a number of different animals from snails over fish, amphibians, reptiles, birds to mammoths have been found in lake sediments.

Present-day Boron, California, Kramer, California, Lancaster, California and Rosamond, California lie in the bed of the former lake; urbanization along with the growth of alluvial fans has buried the shores of the former lake at many sites.

Hydrology 

Several creeks (such as Little Rock Creek) descending from the mountains nourished the lake, the lake had a number of tributaries.

It is possible that Lake Thompson overflowed northwards, into the Fremont Valley;. presently the sill that water would have to flow over is too high for spilling of a  lake to occur, but later sedimentation may have raised the sill. An overflow eastward close to Boron, California towards the Mojave River and/or Lake Harper is also possible but less likely.

History 

A number of lakes developed in the basin of Lake Thompson during the Cenozoic. Deep lakes existed around 36,000 and later as well as 16,200 - 12,600 years before present, with shallower lakebodies around 26,000 - 21,000 years before present, and desiccation between 21,000 - 16,200 years before present as well as during the Holocene. A further lake level increase may have occurred 7,700 years before present.

The lake does not exist anymore, owing to a drier present-day climate, although parts of its former bed can flood during wet winters. Rogers Lake, Rosamond Lake and Buckskin Lake are located on the bed of former Lake Thompson. The rest of the lakebed is covered with lacustrine sediments, although fluvial and aeolian sediments also cover parts of the lakefloor.

References

Sources 

 
 

Pleistocene California
Thompson
Thompson
Thompson